The 1988–89 Rutgers Scarlet Knights men's basketball represented Rutgers University in the 1988–89 NCAA Division I men's basketball season. The head coach was Bob Wenzel, then in his first season with the Scarlet Knights. The team played its home games in Louis Brown Athletic Center in Piscataway Township, New Jersey, and was a member of the Atlantic-10 Conference. The Scarlet Knights finished 3rd in the conference's regular season standings, and would win the Atlantic-10 tournament to earn an automatic bid to the NCAA tournament. Rutgers fell to Iowa, 87–73, in the opening round.

Roster

Schedule and results

|-
!colspan=9| Regular season

|-
!colspan=9| Atlantic-10 tournament

|-
!colspan=9| NCAA tournament

References 

Rutgers
Rutgers Scarlet Knights men's basketball seasons
Rutgers
1988 in sports in New Jersey
1989 in sports in New Jersey